Coughton may refer to the following places in England:
 Coughton, Herefordshire, a hamlet in Herefordshire
 Coughton, Warwickshire, a village in Warwickshire
 Coughton Court, a country house in Warwickshire